Mehuli Ghosh (born 20 November 2000) is an Indian sport shooter. She represents India at international junior shooting championships across the world. Among 123 competitors, she was the only Indian shooting athlete to reach the finals of the 2018 junior shooting competition held in the Czech Republic. She finished in seventh place there. In 2018, at the XXI Commonwealth Games held at Gold Coast, Australia, she won a silver medal in Women's 10m Air Rifle after a shoot-off with Martina Veloso. According to the International Shooting Sport Federation (ISSF), she has a world ranking of sixth and third in Asia.

Early career
Mehuli joined the Serampore Rifle Club in 2014. She was banned by the club for accidentally hitting a person during practice.  Later, Mehuli was mentored and coached by former Indian Olympic finalist and Arjuna Awardee, Joydeep Karmarkar.

She received her training at the Joydeep Karmarkar Shooting Academy. In 2016, she was selected for the Indian National Shooting Championships held in Pune. She received two gold medals and seven silver medals at the national championships. In the 2017 National Championships, Mehuli won eight gold and three bronze medals, and was judged Best Shooter.

Professional career

In 2017, she participated at the preparatory junior shooting championship held in the Czech Republic and finished at the seventh position. She finished in 17th position at the Junior World Shooting Championship held in Germany. Mehuli became Asian Champion in 2017 December in Wako City, Japan, with a score of 420.1 and bagged the Youth Olympics 2018 Quota place. In March 2018, she became one of the youngest competitors from Indian ever to win two World Cup medals at the ISSF World Cup, in Mexico. She created a Junior World Record on the way to winning there. Mehuli qualified for Commonwealth Games 2018. In 2018, at the XXI Commonwealth Games held at Gold Coast, Australia, she won silver in Women's 10m Air Rifle after a shoot-off with Martina Veloso. In 2019, she won gold at the South Asian Games in Nepal.

Ghosh was award the title of "Female Young Athlete of the Year" award at the Sportstar Aces Awards in 2020.

References

External links

2000 births
Indian female sport shooters
21st-century Indian women
21st-century Indian people
Living people
Commonwealth Games medallists in shooting
Commonwealth Games silver medallists for India
ISSF rifle shooters
Shooters at the 2018 Summer Youth Olympics
Medalists at the 2018 Summer Youth Olympics
Shooters at the 2018 Commonwealth Games
South Asian Games gold medalists for India
South Asian Games medalists in shooting
Medallists at the 2018 Commonwealth Games